Solås is a Norwegian. Notable people with the surname include:

Eyvind Solås (1937–2011), Norwegian musician, composer, actor and program host in NRK
Håvard Solås Taugbøl (born 1993), Norwegian cross-country skier
Kjerstin Boge Solås (born 1997), Norwegian handball player
Monica Kristensen Solås (born 1950), Norwegian glaciologist, meteorologist, polar explorer and crime novelist

See also
Solas (disambiguation)

Norwegian-language surnames